Sparganothoides albescens is a species of moth of the family Tortricidae. It is found in Guerrero, Mexico.

The length of the forewings is about 8.1 mm. The ground colour of the forewings is yellowish white, with brownish orange, brown- and black-tipped scales. The hindwings are white.

References

Moths described in 1913
Sparganothoides